Kableshkovo is a small town in the Pomorie Municipality, Bulgaria. As of 2005 the population is 2 866. A small but modern sports complex of PFC Naftex Burgas is under construction. It will include two football terrains and an attached hotel. A golf complex is also expected to be built till 2010, and is expected to be the biggest and most modern golf complex in the country.

External links
Image Gallery of Kableshkovo

Towns in Bulgaria
Populated places in Burgas Province